The 2018–19 Wadi Degla season is the 16th season in the football club's history and 7th consecutive and overall season in the top flight of Egyptian football, the Egyptian Premier League, having been promoted from the Egyptian Second Division in 2010. In addition to the domestic league, Wadi Degla also are participating in this season's editions of the domestic cup, the Egypt Cup. The season covers a period from 1 July 2018 to 30 June 2019.

Kit information
Supplier: JomaSponsor: Neopolis

Players

Current squad

Out on loan

Transfers

Transfers in

Transfers out

Friendly matches

Friendly matches

Competitions

Overview

Egyptian Premier League

League table

Results summary

Results by round

Matches

Egypt Cup

References

Notes

Wadi Degla
Wadi Degla SC seasons